A Lincoln biscuit is a circular short dough biscuit of the shortcake variety, most commonly decorated on one side with a pattern of raised dots.

The McVitie's version had the word 'Lincoln' embossed on the center of the biscuit.

Lincoln biscuits are available in Irish supermarkets and manufactured by Jacob's. The basic recipe has come under academic scrutiny and commercial analysis. In 2004, Campden and Chorleywood Food Research Association set up a research project to understand the textural properties which influence consumer acceptance of short dough biscuits (e.g. Lincoln type): ingredient functionality will enable the hardness, crunchiness and breakdown properties to be varied and their acceptability measured.

In Argentina, Kraft Foods produces Galletitas Lincoln, rectangular Lincoln biscuits with the familiar dot pattern, under the Terrabusi brand name.

Bibliography
Baker, J.S.; Boobier, W.J.; Davies, B. Development of a healthy biscuit: an alternative approach to biscuit manufacture Nutrition Journal March 2006, 5:7 
Fearn T.; Miller A.R.; Thacker D.: Rotary moulded short dough biscuits Part 3: The effects of flour characteristics and recipe water level on the properties of Lincoln biscuits. Flour Milling and Baking Research Association Report (FMBRA) 1983, 102:8-12.
Lawson R.; Miller A.R.; Thacker D.: Rotary moulded short dough biscuits: Part 2. The effects of the level of ingredients on the properties of Lincoln biscuits. Flour Milling and Baking Research Association Report (FMBRA) 1981, 93:15-20.
Miller A.R.; Thacker D.; Turrell S.G.: Performance of single wheat flours in a small-scale baking test for semi-sweet biscuits.  Flour Milling and Baking Research Association Report (FMBRA) 1986, 123:17-24.
Lawson R.; Miller A.R.; Thacker D.: Rotary moulded short-dough biscuits Part 4. The effects of rotary moulder control settings on the properties of Lincoln biscuits. Flour Milling and Baking Research Association Report  (FMBRA) 1983, 106:9-17.

References

External links
Biscuit enthusiasts web-site
Enhanced recipe

Biscuits
Culture in Lincolnshire